The Erqi Memorial Tower, or Erqi Tower is located in Erqi District, in the centre of Zhengzhou city, Henan province, China. The tower is 63 meters high and has 14 floors. It was historically the tallest building in Zhengzhou until 1976.

History
The current Erqi Memorial Tower was completed on September 29, 1971.

This plan will be carried out to better highlight the tower.

Description 
It is made from reinforced concrete, and is done in a Chinese architectural style. The tower's shape, two pentagonal conjoined towers, is meant to commemorate the striking workers of the Erqi Strike, who went on strike while building the Beijing–Hankou railway. At the top of the tower is a five-pointed red star and a 2.7 meter clock below. The clock plays the Chinese revolutionary song The East Is Red every hour. The tower displays various historical relics, pictures, and written materials about the strike.

Notes

Buildings and structures in Zhengzhou
Buildings and structures completed in 1971
Towers in China
Monuments and memorials in China
Tourist attractions in Zhengzhou